I Dream of Jeannie is an American TV series about a genie.

I Dream of Jeannie may also refer to:

"I Dream of Genie", a March 1963 episode of The Twilight Zone
"I Dream of Jeannie", season 13 episode 16 of Dallas
I Dream of Jeannie with the Light Brown Hair, a 1940 American short film directed by Larry Ceballos
I Dream of Jeanie (film), a 1952 American film also known as I Dream of Jeannie (with the Light Brown Hair), directed by Allan Dwan
"Jeanie with the Light Brown Hair" a Stephen Foster song